Sangob Rattanusorn (born 1943) is a former badminton player from Thailand who won numerous titles and represented his country in team play from the early 1960s through the early 1970s.

Career
A fine "all-arounder" (proficient in all three events: singles, men's doubles, and mixed doubles), Rattanusorn won eight Thai national singles titles between 1962 and 1970, and the Southeast Asian Peninsular singles title in 1967. Outside of Asia, his most significant victories came in doubles events. He shared the U.S. Open mixed doubles title with England's Margaret Barrand in 1963, and the Canadian Open mixed doubles title with the USA's Lois Alston in 1968. In 1968 he also won the Canadian Open and Dutch Open men's doubles titles, and reached the men's doubles semifinal at the All-England Championships with fellow countryman Chavalert Chumkum. Perhaps the best year in his badminton career, however, came toward the end of it in 1973, when he helped Thailand to a surprise victory over Malaysia in the Asian zone final of Thomas Cup before bowing to perennial champion Indonesia in the inter-zone ties.

Achievements

Asian Games 
Men's singles

Asian Championships 
Men's singles

Men's doubles

Southeast Asian Peninsular Games 
Men's singles

Men's doubles

International tournaments 
Men's singles

Men's doubles

Mixed doubles

References

Sangob Rattanusorn
Living people
1943 births
Asian Games medalists in badminton
Badminton players at the 1962 Asian Games
Badminton players at the 1966 Asian Games
Badminton players at the 1970 Asian Games
Badminton players at the 1974 Asian Games
Sangob Rattanusorn
Sangob Rattanusorn
Sangob Rattanusorn
Medalists at the 1962 Asian Games
Medalists at the 1966 Asian Games
Medalists at the 1970 Asian Games
Sangob Rattanusorn
Sangob Rattanusorn
Sangob Rattanusorn
Southeast Asian Games medalists in badminton
Competitors at the 1965 Southeast Asian Peninsular Games
Competitors at the 1967 Southeast Asian Peninsular Games
Competitors at the 1973 Southeast Asian Peninsular Games